Amastra crassilabrum was a species of air-breathing land snail, a terrestrial pulmonate gastropod mollusks in the family Amastridae. This species was endemic to Oahu, and was known from the Waianae Range.

References

Amastra
Extinct gastropods
Extinct Hawaiian animals
Taxonomy articles created by Polbot